The Manali Wildlife Sanctuary is a wildlife sanctuary in Himachal Pradesh in northern India.  
The sanctuary starts about 2 km from Manali. It is the catchment of Manalsu khad. A path from Manali log huts and Dhungri temple passes through dense Deodar, Kail, Horse chestnut, Walnut and Maple forests. Musk deer, Monal and Brown bear, Leopard and Snow leopard are some of the common animals seen here.  Herds of Ibex are seen migrating in the glacier zone in summers.
The area of the sanctuary is about 31.8 square kilometres. The following area was declared as a sanctuary on 26 February 1954, under the Punjab Birds and Wild Animals Protection Act of 1933.

External links
himachaltourism.nic.in
hptdc.gov.in

Wildlife sanctuaries in Himachal Pradesh
Geography of Kullu district
Manali, Himachal Pradesh
Protected areas established in 1954
1954 establishments in Himachal Pradesh